Progression is the second album by Markus Schulz, released in 2007. This progressive trance album was released under exclusive license in the United States and Canada to Ultra Records Inc. The album features the vocals of Kate Cameron, Anita Kelsey, Carrie Skipper and Dauby Talles. It also includes collaborations with Chakra and Andy Moor.

Track listing
"I Am" (featuring Chakra)– 6:27
"Spilled Cranberries" - 4:02
"On a Wave" (featuring Anita Kelsey) – 5:31
"Lost Cause" (featuring Carrie Skipper) – 6:42
"Mainstage" - 1:27
"Fly to Colors" - 7:19
"Let It Go" - 5:27
"Daydream" (featuring Andy Moor) - 5:54
"SLA9" - 6:21
"Perfect" (featuring Dauby Talles) - 6:33
"Trinidad to Miami" - 7:55
"Cause You Know" (featuring Departure) - 7:57
"Cause You Know (Is This The End)" (featuring Departure) - 5:50

References

2007 albums
Trance albums
Armada Music albums